VOID (Video Overview in Deceleration) is a 5.1 surround sound DVD by The Flaming Lips released on August 23, 2005.

It contains new commentary by the band and nineteen music videos made by the band throughout their musical career.

Track listing
 "Mr. Ambulance Driver"
 "SpongeBob and Patrick Confront the Psychic Wall of Energy"
 "Fight Test"
 "Yoshimi Battles the Pink Robots (Pt. 1)"
 "Do You Realize??" (UK version)
 "Race for the Prize"
 "Waiting for a Superman"
 "This Here Giraffe"
 "When You Smile"
 "Bad Days"
 "Christmas at the Zoo"
 "Be My Head"
 "She Don't Use Jelly"
 "Turn It On"
 "Frogs"
 "Talkin' 'Bout the Smiling Deathporn Immortality Blues (Everyone Wants to Live Forever)"
 "Phoebe Battles the Pink Robots"
 "Are You a Hypnotist??"
 "Do You Realize??" (U.S. version)

References
FlamingLips.com

The Flaming Lips video albums
The Flaming Lips compilation albums
2005 compilation albums
2005 video albums
Music video compilation albums